Halina Kanstancinaŭna Harełava, also known as Galina Gorelova (born 5 March 1951), is a Belarusian contemporary composer.

Biography
Harełava was born in Minsk, Byelorussian SSR (now Belarus), and studied music at the National Conservatory in Minsk with Dźmitry Smolski, graduating in 1977. After completing her studies, she took at position teaching theory and composition at the Conservatory. She received the State Prize of Belarus in 1992 for Anno mundis ardentis.

Works
Harelava's works incorporate elements of Belarusian folk themes, and she is noted for children's compositions.  Selected works include:

Liryčnaja kantata [Lyrical Cantata] (traditional Belarusian texts) for female chorus and orchestra, 1979 
Anno mundis ardentis (P. Antokol'sky, G. Appolinaire, L. Aragon, V. Bryusov, S. Kirsanov, A. Rimbault, A. Tarkovsky) for mezzo-soprano, baritone and orchestra, 1989
Tysiača hadoŭ nadzieji [A Thousand Years of Hope] (poets of the 10th–20th centuries) for female voice and orchestra, 1990
Violin Concerto, 1979 
Oboe Concerto, 1984 
Bandaroŭna, symphonic poem, 1986 
Balalaika Concerto, 1991 
Trumpet Concerto, 1992 
Guitar Concerto, 1994 
Concerto for viola, string orchestra and bells, 2000
Piejzažy [Landscapes], symphonic poem 
Alošyn kutok [Alyosha’s Corner], symphonic poem
Ballade for cello and piano, 1987 
Sonata for violin and piano, 1987 
Lehienda for trombone and piano, 1990 
Sonata Al fresco for double bass and piano, 1995 
Sonata for piano, 1996 
Sonata for clarinet, 1996
Al Sereno, Concert Fantasy for viola and piano, 1998
Eine kleine Nachtmusik for viola and piano, 2001
Lucia perpetuo moto for viola and piano, 2001
Introduction and Fantasy on a Ragtime Theme for viola and piano, 2003
Dziavočyja pieśni [Girls’ Songs] song cycle (M. Bogdanovich), 1979
Sumnyja pieśni [Sad Songs] song cycle (A. Akhmatova), 1980 
Chvała biadniakam [In Praise of the Poor] song cycle (P. Béranger), 1991

References

External links
 Galina Gorelova at the Living Composers Project

1951 births
Living people
20th-century classical composers
Women classical composers
Belarusian composers
Academic staff of the Belarusian State Academy of Music
Women music educators
20th-century women composers